Shaun Silva is a music video director who works primarily in the country music field. He has directed a number of music videos for many country music artists, including many of Kenny Chesney's music videos. His other clients include Jason Aldean, Danielle Bradbery, Luke Bryan, Blake Shelton, Limp Bizkit, Old Dominion, Sugarland, Brooks & Dunn, Florida Georgia Line, Rascal Flatts, Carrie Underwood, and Sonya Isaacs. In addition, Silva has also directed a few videos for acts from outside music genres, such as Uncle Kracker, Kaleo, and 3 Doors Down.

In 2008, Silva received four nominations in the Country Music Television (CMT) awards. In 2010, he won the award for Best Director.

Silva is married to country music singer Shannon Brown. They have two sons.

References

External links
 

American music video directors
Living people
Year of birth missing (living people)